Tintorettor Jishu ("Tintoretto's Jesus") is a 2008 Indian Bengali thriller film directed by Sandip Ray based on the story of the same name by Satyajit Ray. It is the third film of the New Feluda Franchise, as well as the sequel of Kailashey Kelenkari (2007).

Plot
The Niyogi family have a famous painting by the Italian master Tintoretto. However, not everyone is aware of the value of the painting. One of the family members steals it, and international buyers are interested in it. Feluda chases the criminals all the way to Hong Kong. There was a surprise waiting for him there. Eventually, Feluda (with the help of a relative stranger) succeeds in solving the mystery.

Cast
 Sabyasachi Chakrabarty as Feluda
 Parambrata Chatterjee as Topshe
 Bibhu Bhattacharya as Jatayu
 Syed Hasan Imam as Soumya Neogi
 Tota Roy Chowdhury as Robin/Rajsekhar Neogi
 Silajit Majumder as Nandakumar Neogi/Fake Rudrasekhar Neogi
 Biswajit Chakraborty as Hiralal Somani
 Paran Bandyopadhyay as Purnendu Pal
 Joydip Mukherjee as Inspector Mahadeb Mondal
 Debesh Roy Chowdhury as Bankim Babu
 Rajaram Yagnik as Bhudev Singh

• Sagar Bhoumik, a young Bengali painter from Dum Dum Cantonment, North Kolkata, painted the depiction of Tintoretto's Jesus used in the film.

References

External links

Review in I Love Kolkata
An analysis of how the films deviates from the book
Additional images of the film at calcuttatube.com

2008 films
Bengali-language Indian films
Indian children's films
Indian detective films
Films based on Indian novels
Films directed by Sandip Ray
Films with screenplays by Satyajit Ray
2000s Bengali-language films
2000s children's films
Tintoretto